The J.C.J. van Speijk Lighthouse is a lighthouse on the North Sea coast near Egmond aan Zee, in the municipality of Bergen, North Holland, in the Netherlands. The foundation of the lighthouse, shaped like a tomb, is the official Dutch memorial to Jan van Speyk, a hero to the Dutch people.

The treacherous sea near Egmond necessitated the construction of two lighthouses, which were built in 1833. The northside of the light is red to warn for dangerous shallows near the coast north of Egmond. As soon as a ship leaves the danger zone it sees the white light. The south tower, on the Torensduin, was deactivated in 1891 and demolished in 1915. The north tower is still there, and is declared a Rijksmonument.

Van Speijkmonument 
The lighthouse was selected in 1834 as the national J.C.J van Speijkmonument, to honor the memory of the Dutch naval hero. The original idea was to build a new tower as a monument, but there were insufficient funds, so the existing tower was reconstructed. The monument was designed by Jan David Zocher and built by J. Bos from dimension stone.

After the construction of the North Sea Canal and the two lighthouses at its mouth, in IJmuiden, the van Speijk lighthouse was equipped with red windows, to avoid confusion. In 1891 it was equipped with a rotating light; in the same year, the south tower was extinguished.

In 1984, the 150th anniversary of the lighthouse and monument was celebrated; a commemorative booklet was published by the Museum van Egmond.

Timeline
 1823: Decision to build a lighthouse is made
 1833: Construction starts
 1834: Construction finished, lighthouse keepers appointed, fire is lit
 1838: Royal decree to renovate lighthouse
 1841: Renovation as monument finished
 1879: Light extinguished temporarily (15 February to 15 March)
 1891: Rotating light installed
 1915: Day screens removed
 1922: Electric light installed, balcony redone in concrete, lighthouse renewed
 1936: Characteristic changed to Iso 10s
 1967: Lighthouse declared Rijksmonument

Webcams
The lighthouse has five webcams to keep an eye on the coast. The webcams can be accessed through visitegmond.nl.

Gallery

See also

 List of lighthouses in the Netherlands

References

External links

 Vuurtoren Jan van Speijk
 Informatie op www.vuurtorens.net

Lighthouses completed in 1833
Lighthouses in North Holland
Rijksmonuments in North Holland
Bergen, North Holland